Engine Trouble is a 2002 17-minute-long fantasy short film. It was directed by Brad Barnes, written by Brad and Todd Barnes, produced by Todd Barnes, and starred Celine du Tertre and the voice of Academy Award-winner actor Christopher Walken.

Plot
A 7-year-old girl who is convinced by her tough-talking toy fire engine, Rusty, that he is needed as a reinforcement for the FDNY on September 11.

Cast

External links

2002 films
2002 short films
2002 fantasy films
Films shot in New York (state)
Films shot in Connecticut
2000s English-language films
American fantasy films
American short films
2000s American films